Hinamori may refer to:

 Momo Hinamori, a fictional character from the manga series Bleach by Tite Kubo
 Amu Hinamori, a fictional character from the manga series Shugo Chara! by Peach-Pit
 Hinamori (official)